Lovers Key State Park is a  Florida State Park located on Lover's Key and three other barrier islands—Black Island, Inner and Long Key. The park lies within the city limits of Bonita Springs and is just north of Bonita Beach. The park uses a Fort Myers Beach zip code for address purposes.

Activities include shelling, swimming, picnicking, boating, and sunbathing, as well as canoeing/kayaking, hiking, bicycling and wildlife viewing. Among the wildlife of the park are West Indian manatees, bottlenose dolphins, marsh rabbits, and over 40 bird species,   including roseate spoonbills, osprey, snowy egret, bald eagles, and American kestrel. Black Island has woodpeckers, hawks, owls and warblers.

Amenities include a two-mile (3 km) long beach on Lovers Key. Black Island has over five miles (8 km) of multiuse trails; bicycle, canoe, and kayak rentals,
gazebo, picnic areas, boat ramp, and two playgrounds. The park is open from 8:00 am till sundown year-round.

Gallery

References

External links
 Lovers Key State Park at Florida State Parks
 Lovers Key / Carl E. Johnson State Recreation Area at Absolutely Florida
 Lovers Key State Recreation Area at Wildernet
  DEP confirms park in city limits (page 1) - December 2005

State parks of Florida
Islands of Florida
Parks in Lee County, Florida
Beaches of Lee County, Florida
Bonita Springs, Florida
Beaches of Florida